Como is a suburb of Perth, Western Australia. Its local government area is the City of South Perth. The suburb has a population of 12,423. Canning Highway divides the suburb.

History
The suburb of Como was originally made up of three land grants, purchased by Christchurch farmer Edmund Hugh Comer in February 1891. The land was subdivided in 1905 under the name Como Estate, which is thought to be derived from either the owner's surname or the area of the same name in northern Italy.
Como forms part of the City of South Perth.

Facilities
Como is serviced by the Canning Bridge railway station, which is on the Mandurah railway line, and is served by buses as well.

There are four schools in the area. These are the Collier and Como Primary Schools, Como Secondary College (previously Como Senior High School), and Penrhos College, a private all-girls school which has a primary school and a high school.

References

 
Suburbs of Perth, Western Australia
Suburbs in the City of South Perth